Kovur mandal is one of the 46 mandals located on the Nellore district. It is under the Nellore Revenue Division.

Mandals in Nellore district